The Battery "E" 1st Michigan Light Artillery Regiment was an artillery battery that served in the Union Army during the American Civil War.

Service
Battery "E"  was organized at Grand Rapids, Albion, and Marshall, Michigan and was mustered into service on  December 6, 1861.

The battery was mustered out on July 30, 1865.

Total strength and casualties
Over its existence, the battery carried a total of 333 men on its muster rolls.

The battery lost 33 enlisted men who died of disease, for a total of 33
fatalities.

Commanders
Captain John H. Dennis

See also
List of Michigan Civil War Units
Michigan in the American Civil War

Notes

References
The Civil War Archive

Artillery
1865 disestablishments in Michigan
Artillery units and formations of the American Civil War
1861 establishments in Michigan
Military units and formations established in 1861
Military units and formations disestablished in 1865